Following are lists of dramas and series produced by Hong-Kong bases television network TVB.

Dramas
 List of TVB dramas in 2010
 List of TVB dramas in 2011
 List of TVB dramas in 2012
 List of TVB dramas in 2013
 List of TVB dramas in 2014
 List of TVB dramas in 2015
 List of TVB dramas in 2016
 List of TVB dramas in 2017
 List of TVB dramas in 2018
 List of TVB dramas in 2019
 List of TVB dramas in 2020

Series
 List of TVB series (1977)
 List of TVB series (1978)
 List of TVB series (1979)
 List of TVB series (1980)
 List of TVB series (1981)
 List of TVB series (1982)
 List of TVB series (1983)
 List of TVB series (1984)
 List of TVB series (1985)
 List of TVB series (1986)
 List of TVB series (1987)
 List of TVB series (1988)
 List of TVB series (1989)
 List of TVB series (1990)
 List of TVB series (1991)
 List of TVB series (1992)
 List of TVB series (1993)
 List of TVB series (1994)
 List of TVB series (1995)
 List of TVB series (1996)
 List of TVB series (1997)
 List of TVB series (1998)
 List of TVB series (1995)
 List of TVB series (1999)
 List of TVB series (2000)
 List of TVB series (2001)
 List of TVB series (2002)
 List of TVB series (2003)
 List of TVB series (2004)
 List of TVB series (2005)
 List of TVB series (2006)
 List of TVB series (2007)
 List of TVB series (2008)
 List of TVB series (2009)